Sandrine Hurel (born 7 August 1968 in Lisieux, Calvados) is a member of the National Assembly of France.  She represents the Seine-Maritime department,  and is a member of the Socialist Party and of the Socialiste, radical, citoyen et divers gauche parliamentary group.

References

1968 births
Living people
People from Lisieux
Socialist Party (France) politicians
French Senators of the Fifth Republic
Women members of the National Assembly (France)
Women members of the Senate (France)
Deputies of the 13th National Assembly of the French Fifth Republic
Deputies of the 14th National Assembly of the French Fifth Republic
21st-century French women politicians
Senators of Seine-Maritime
Politicians from Normandy